Rashaad Magiet (born 30 May 1979) is a South African cricketer. He played in 23 first-class and 8 List A matches from 1998 to 2008.

References

External links
 

1979 births
Living people
South African cricketers
Boland cricketers
Gauteng cricketers
Western Province cricketers
Cricketers from Cape Town